Deborah M. Axelrod is an American surgeon who specializes in breast cancer.

Education
Axelrod earned her undergraduate degree in chemistry at University of Pennsylvania, then earned her MD at Tel Aviv University in 1982, then did residencies at Mount Sinai Beth Israel and a fellowship at Memorial Sloan Kettering Cancer Center.  She worked at Mount Sinai and Saint Vincent's Catholic Medical Center before joining NYU in 2004.

Career
Axelrod is on the board of directors for several cancer support organizations and works to educate the public about breast cancer, including an ongoing program in the Arab American community.
She is Director of Clinical Breast Programs and Services and Medical Director of Community Cancer Education and Outreach at NYU Langone Medical Center.

Selected works

References

External links

1957 births
Living people
American surgeons
New York University faculty
American women academics
Women surgeons
21st-century American women